Gabriel-Jacques de Salignac de La Motte (25 July 1688 – 2 October 1746) styled vicomte de Saint-Julien later marquis de Fénelon, was an 18th-century French military commander and diplomat.

A career soldier, his military appointments included Captain in the Royal-Cuirassiers from 1706, Colonel of the Regiment of Poitou and Brigadier-General from 1719, Maréchal de camp in 1734, Governor of Le Quesnoy from 1735, before promotion to Lieutenant-General of the French Army in 1738.  

Vicomte de Saint-Julien also served Louis XV of France as Ambassador to the Netherlands at The Hague from 1724, before being posted to London in 1741.

Family 
Descended from an aristocratic family of churchmen, courtiers and soldiers, he was accorded the courtesy title of Vicomte de Saint-Julien. Upon the death of his father François de Salignac in 1742, he succeeded in the family titles as Marquis de Fénelon et de Salignac, comte de La Motte, baron de Loubert, seigneur de Mareuil, de Boisse & de Péricard, etc.

He married, on 24 December 1721, Françoise-Louise, daughter of Louis-Urbain le Peletier, marquis de Rosanbo; they had seven children, including François-Louis de Salignac, who as eldest son succeeded him in the marquessate upon his death in 1746. His wife, Françoise-Louise marquise de Fénelon, died in 1782.

Honours 
 Conseiller d'Etat 
 Chevalier du Saint-Esprit
 Chevalier de Malte

See also 
 Archbishop François Fénelon
 Château de Fénelon
 Château de La Motte-Fénelon
 Château de Salignac
 Fénelon

Notes 

1688 births
1746 deaths
French noble families
French marquesses
18th-century French diplomats
Ambassadors of France to Great Britain
Ambassadors of France to the Netherlands
French generals
Knights of Malta